This is a list of rivers of Saint Vincent and the Grenadines. Rivers are listed in clockwise order, starting at the north end of the island.

Saint Vincent
Fancy River
Rabacca Dry River
Caratal River
Grand Sable River
Byera River
Colonarie River
Union River
Yambou River
Greathead River
Buccament River
Rutland River
Cumberland River 
Richmond River
Wallibou River (Wallilabou River)
River 14   (South Rivers)

References
, GEOnet Names Server
Tourist Map
Environmental Investigation and Cataloguing, St. Vincent Cross Country Road Project Final Report

 
Saint Vincent and the Grenadines
Rivers
S